Cossington Gate railway station was a small station serving Cossington village in Leicestershire.

It served the Midland Counties Railway, built in 1840, which shortly joined the North Midland Railway and the Birmingham and Derby Junction Railway to form the Midland Railway.

The station was associated with a level crossing - hence Cossington Gate. Station buildings were provided in 1846 looked after by the crossing keeper.

However, when the lines were quadrupled in 1873, the crossing was replaced by a bridge and the station closed.

References

Railway stations in Great Britain opened in 1845
Railway stations in Great Britain closed in 1873
Former Midland Railway stations
Disused railway stations in Leicestershire